Meinhard is a municipality in the Werra-Meißner-Kreis in Hesse, Germany.

Geography

Location
The community lies in the North Hesse Low Mountain Range landscape on the edge of the Werra valley, 3 km from the district seat of Eschwege.

Near Meinhard-Frieda, the Frieda empties into the Werra. After heavy rainfall, it can swell into a fast-running river that can wash the bank of the Werra away. On the bank facing Meinhard-Jestädt, the Wehre empties into the Werra.

Neighbouring communities
Meinhard borders in the northeast and the east on the communities of Volkerode, Pfaffschwende, Kella and Geismar (all four in Thuringia’s Eichsfeld district), in the southeast on the town of Wanfried, in the south and west on the town of Eschwege and in the northwest on the town of Bad Sooden-Allendorf (all three in the Werra-Meißner-Kreis).

Constituent communities
The community’s seven Ortsteile are Frieda, Grebendorf (administrative seat), Hitzelrode, Jestädt, Neuerode, Motzenrode and Schwebda.

Politics

Community council

The municipal election held on 26 March 2006 yielded the following results:

Mayor
2002–2013: Hans Giller (SPD)
2013–incumbent: Gerhold Brill

Culture and sightseeing

Buildings
 Ruins of Schwebda Castle (moated)

Economy and infrastructure

Transport
Through Bundesstraße 249 (Eschwege-Mühlhausen), which runs right through the community, Meinhard is linked to the highway network.

Famous people
 Friedrich Rudolf Ernst Freiherr von Feilitzsch (b. 14 July 1858 in Jestädt; d. 23 January 1942 in Bückeburg), politician in the Principality of Schaumburg-Lippe and its first Prime Minister.
 Heinz Fromm (b. 10 July 1948 in Meinhard-Frieda) has been since June 2000 President of the Federal Office for Constitutional Protection

References

External links
 Homepage of the constituent community of Grebendorf 

Werra-Meißner-Kreis